Schrobenhausen (Central Bavarian: Schrobenhausn) is a town in the district of Neuburg-Schrobenhausen in Bavaria, Germany.

The town hosts notable German arms manufacturers like MBDA and TDW.

Schrobenhausen is also famous for its rich harvest of white asparagus in May/June.

International relations

Twin towns
Schrobenhausen is twinned with
  Thiers, France
 Bridgnorth, England (since 1992)
 Perg, Austria (since 1989)

Famous citizens 

 Franz von Lenbach (1836-1904), painter, born in Schrobenhausen
 Joseph Sattler (1867-1931), graphic artist, born in Schrobenhausen
 Friedl Rinder (1905-2001), German chess master, born in Schrobenhausen
 Hubert Fichte (1935-1986), author. Lived in Steingriff as a child in 1941, then in Schrobenhausen from 1942 to 1943 
 Walter Mixa (born in 1941), pastor from Schrobenhausen (1975-1996), Bishop of Eichstätt (1996-2005) and of Augsburg (2005-2010)
 Marion Schick, née Pilnei (born in 1958), former President of the University of Applied Sciences in Munich | Fachhochschule München, former Minister of Culture, Youth and Sports of the State of Baden-Württemberg

References

Neuburg-Schrobenhausen